opened in Ashoro, Hokkaidō, Japan in 1998. The collection includes desmostylians and other fossils from the area as well as geological exhibits relating to the Onnetō Hot Falls.

Publications
  (2000—)

See also
 List of prehistoric mammals of Japan
 Mukawa Town Hobetsu Museum

References

External links
  Ashoro Museum of Paleontology

Museums in Hokkaido
Ashoro, Hokkaido
Natural history museums in Japan
Fossil museums
Museums established in 1998
1998 establishments in Japan